Javier Aníbal Elizondo (born 31 October 1982) is an Argentine footballer who plays as a striker. His last club was Huracán de Tres Arroyos.

Honours

Club
 Curicó Unido
 Primera B (1): 2016–17

External links
 Javier Elizondo at Football-Lineups
 
 

1982 births
Living people
Argentine footballers
Argentine expatriate footballers
Argentina international footballers
Huracán de Tres Arroyos footballers
Club Atlético Patronato footballers
Club y Biblioteca Ramón Santamarina footballers
Deportes La Serena footballers
C.D. Huachipato footballers
Cobreloa footballers
Querétaro F.C. footballers
C.D. Antofagasta footballers
Audax Italiano footballers
Curicó Unido footballers
Liga MX players
Chilean Primera División players
Expatriate footballers in Chile
Expatriate footballers in Mexico
Association football forwards
Footballers from Buenos Aires